Dalytra is a genus of assassin bugs (family Reduviidae), in the subfamily Harpactorinae.

Species
 Dalytra culani (Fernando, 1958)
 Dalytra maculosa (Distant, 1904)
 Dalytra rapax (Stål, 1859)
 Dalytra spinifex (Thunberg, 1783)
 Dalytra straminipes (Distant, 1904)

References

Reduviidae
Cimicomorpha genera